Joan Wheeler Ankrum (January 8, 1913 – December 20, 2001) was an American film actress and founder of the Ankrum Gallery on La Cienega Boulevard in Los Angeles.

Life and career
Ankrum was born Joan Natalia Wheeler on January 8, 1913, in Palo Alto, California. Ankrum was one of four siblings. She had one older sister and two younger brothers.

She got her start in acting with Pasadena Playhouse, where she met her husband, character actor Morris Ankrum. They were married on August 16, 1935, in Benbow, California, and had 2 sons, David and Cary. Morris Ankrum died in 1964.

In 1960, Ankrum founded Ankrum Gallery, which was located on La Cienega Boulevard next to a number of other galleries. Joseph Hirshhorn contributed some of the initial funding for the gallery, and would go on to be a loyal patron, along with his wife Olga Hirshhorn. Ankrum initially founded the gallery in order to show her nephew Morris Broderson's work, but the gallery would go on to handle the artwork of other California artists such as Helen Lundeberg, Richard Bauer, Hans Burkhard, Suzanne Jackson, Samella Lewis, and Lorser Feitelson. The Smithsonian Archives of American Art, which holds the gallery's archives, notes that Ankrum Gallery "was among the earliest to exhibit the work of black artists." A 1971 New York Times article about women gallery owners in Los Angeles noted that Ankrum Gallery was "the largest in sales and size in La Cienega Boulevard" at the time.

In 1984, Ankrum married co-owner and partner in Ankrum Gallery, actor William Challee.

Ankrum was a co-founder of Art Dealers Association of America, and an active member of the Black Arts Council. She also helped organize the Monday Night Art Walk program on La Cienega Boulevard.

Broadway roles
 Growing Pains (1933) as Prudence
 Strangers at Home (1934) as Jean Crosby
 Western Waters (1937) as Penelope

Selected filmography
 Madame Du Barry as Florette, Young Girl at Dear Park
 Desirable as Barbara, 'Babs'
 The Merry Frinks as Lucille Frink... aka Happy Family (UK)
 Smarty as  Mrs. Bonnie Durham... aka Hit Me Again (UK)
 Twenty Million Sweethearts as Marge, the Receptionist

References

External links
 
 
  Wedgespeaks - Morris Broderson bio

1913 births
2001 deaths
20th-century American actresses
American film actresses
Actresses from California
American stage actresses
American art dealers
Women art dealers